Finders Keepers were an English band featuring then-future Trapeze members Glenn Hughes, Mel Galley, and Dave Holland.

Hughes later sang for Deep Purple (with whom he also played bass) and Black Sabbath (on the album Seventh Star and part of its supporting tour). Galley later played guitar for Whitesnake. Holland later played drums for Judas Priest.

Finders Keepers released several singles, including a cover of "Sadie, The Cleaning Lady" in 1968.

The original band consisted of Roy "Dripper" Kent on vocals, Alan Clee on lead guitar, Ralph Oakley on rhythm guitar, Jake Elcock on bass and David Williams on drums. In 1966, Ralph Oakley left the band, and Finders Keepers continued as a four-piece. In 1967, there were several line-up changes, resulting in the band with Ian "Sludge" Lees on vocals, Mel Galley and Alan Clee on lead guitars, Phil Overfield on bass and David Williams on drums. In 1968, Glenn Hughes joined the band taking Phil Overfield's place. Later that year Dave Holland joined the band, taking David Williams' place. The resulting line-up of Ian "Sludge" Lees, Mel Galley, Alan Clee, Glenn Hughes and Dave Holland were together until 1969, when the band broke up, and Mel Galley, Glenn Hughes and Dave Holland went on to form Trapeze.

External links
Coast to Coast - the electronic Glenn hughes fansite
Brumbeat.net

English rock music groups
Musical groups established in 1966
Musical groups disestablished in 1969
1966 establishments in England
1969 disestablishments in England